Henryk Grzybowski (17 July 1934 – 17 November 2012) was a Polish footballer. He was part of Poland's squad at the 1960 Summer Olympics, but he did not play in any matches.

References

1934 births
Poland international footballers
Association football defenders
Polish footballers
Olympic footballers of Poland
Footballers at the 1960 Summer Olympics
Legia Warsaw players
Footballers from Warsaw
2012 deaths